Jody Lukoki (15 November 1992 – 9 May 2022) was a Congolese-Dutch professional footballer who played as a winger for various clubs and the DR Congo national team.

Lukoki progressed through the famed Ajax youth academy, making his professional debut in 2011 against rivals Feyenoord. After failing to make his definitive breakthrough he was sent on loan to Cambuur, before joining PEC Zwolle on a permanent deal in 2014. He moved abroad after one season, signing with Bulgarian club Ludogorets Razgrad where he enjoyed considerable success. Afterwards, short spells followed with Yeni Malatyaspor and Twente.

He was a Netherlands youth international and gained caps at U19, U20 and U21 level. He received his first call-up for DR Congo in 2015, and represented the country on three occasions.

On 9 May 2022, Lukoki died at the age of 29 of a cardiac arrest at a hospital in Almere, after an argument with his family had turned violent. Months earlier, he had been convicted of domestic violence leading to his contract with Twente being terminated.

Club career

Early life and career 
Lukoki was born in Zaire but immigrated to the Netherlands with his parents and his twin brother, NAC Breda player Madjer Lukoki at a young age due to the First Congo War. Growing up in Amsterdam, he joined the local club VVA/Spartaan at the age of ten.

Ajax
After playing for VVA/Spartaan and Young Boys Haarlem, Lukoki joined the youth ranks of Ajax. He made his debut for the first team in the 2–0 home win against rivals Feyenoord on 19 January 2011, replacing Lorenzo Ebecilio in the 80th minute. He immediately got the home fans on his side by giving Tim de Cler a nutmeg when the ball was already out of play. He would go on to make his second appearance in the 3–2 away loss against rivals ADO Den Haag on 20 March 2011. The 2011–12 season started with Lukoki scoring his first career Eredivisie goal in his season debut against Roda JC.

SC Cambuur (loan)
Having contributed to three national titles in his first three seasons with Ajax, Lukoki would remain third-choice winger under Frank de Boer and was granted permission to explore other options. On 2 August 2013, he was loaned out to newly promoted SC Cambuur for the season.

PEC Zwolle
On 7 August 2014, it was announced that Lukoki would transfer to PEC Zwolle on a three-year contract for a reported €1.5 million, joining the team that had recently defeated Ajax in the KNVB Cup final as well as the Johan Cruijff Shield. On 21 August 2014, Lukoki scored PEC Zwolle's first-ever goal in a continental competition, when they faced Sparta Prague in the 2014–15 UEFA Europa League play-off round. The match ended in a 1–1 draw, with Lukoki scoring in the 77th minute in the club's European debut.

Ludogorets
On 26 June 2015, Lukoki signed with the Bulgarian side Ludogorets Razgrad. The Congolese scored three goals in the 2016–17 UEFA Champions League second qualifying round matches against Mladost Podgorica. He scored his first goal in the league on 26 November 2016 in match against Botev Plovdiv. During his time at Ludogorets Razgrad he was nicknamed "Синът на вятъра" (English: "The Son of the Wind"). On 28 September 2017, Lukoki netted the winning goal in the 2–1 victory over 1899 Hoffenheim in a UEFA Europa League group stage match. On 1 April 2020, Ludogorets Razgrad announced that they had mutually agreed to terminate Lukoki's contract, allowing him to return to the Netherlands.

Later career
In July 2020, Lukoki signed a two-year contract with Turkish club Yeni Malatyaspor. He made his competitive debut on 18 September in a 1–1 league draw against Göztepe. His contract was terminated by mutual consent on 26 April 2021, after making 12 total appearances for the club.

After leaving Malatyaspor as a free agent, Lukoki returned to the Netherlands, joining Eredivisie club Twente on a two-year contract in June 2021. A few days after signing, he suffered a serious knee injury during practice, which sidelined him for a season. Twente released Lukoki on 17 February 2022, shortly after he was convicted of domestic violence.

International career
Lukoki held dual citizenship and was eligible to represent either Netherlands or DR Congo at senior level. He represented Netherlands at various youth levels, reaching third place with the U-19 team at the  Festival International 'Espoirs' 2012 in Toulon, France. On 19 March 2015, Lukoki received his first call for the DR Congo team for the match against Iraq and earned his first cap in that game.

Personal life

Domestic violence conviction
In January 2022, Lukoki was convicted of domestic violence, receiving a two-week suspended sentence with a probationary period of three years. He was also ordered to perform 80 hours of community service.

Death
On 9 May 2022, Lukoki died at the age of 29 of a cardiac arrest at a hospital in Almere, after being beaten by his family in an argument.

Career statistics

Club

International

Honours
Ajax
 Eredivisie: 2010–11, 2011–12, 2012–13

Ludogorets Razgrad
 Bulgarian First League: 2015–16, 2016–17, 2017–18, 2018–19
 Bulgarian Supercup: 2018, 2019

References

External links
 Voetbal International profile 
 
 Netherlands stats at OnsOranje
 

1992 births
2022 deaths
Twin sportspeople
Dutch twins
Association football wingers
Democratic Republic of the Congo footballers
Democratic Republic of the Congo expatriate footballers
Democratic Republic of the Congo international footballers
Democratic Republic of the Congo emigrants to the Netherlands
Dutch footballers
Netherlands under-21 international footballers
Netherlands youth international footballers
Footballers from Amsterdam
AFC Ajax players
SC Cambuur players
PEC Zwolle players
PFC Ludogorets Razgrad players
Yeni Malatyaspor footballers
FC Twente players
Eredivisie players
First Professional Football League (Bulgaria) players
Second Professional Football League (Bulgaria) players
Süper Lig players
Democratic Republic of the Congo expatriate sportspeople in Bulgaria
Democratic Republic of the Congo expatriate sportspeople in Turkey
Expatriate footballers in Bulgaria
Expatriate footballers in Turkey